All Hallows-by-the-Tower, at one time dedicated jointly to All Hallows (All Saints) and the Virgin Mary and sometimes known as All Hallows Barking, is an ancient Anglican church on Byward Street in the City of London, overlooking the Tower of London.

According to the church website and other sources it is "the oldest church in the City of London" and was founded in AD 675, although recent research has questioned these claims. The church survived the Great Fire of London in 1666, but was badly damaged during the Blitz in World War II. Following extensive reconstruction, it was rededicated in 1957. From 1922 until 1962 the vicar was Tubby Clayton, and the church is still the guild church of Toc H, the international Christian organisation that he founded.

History 

The origin and early history of All Hallows-by-the-Tower church are obscure. At the time of the Dissolution of the Monasteries in 1539 the church belonged to Barking Abbey, a wealthy Benedictine nunnery in Barking, Essex, originally established in the 7th century. The association with Barking was a long one, and All Hallows church was already known as "Berkyncherche" in the 12th century. According to Domesday Book in 1086, Barking Abbey possessed "28 houses and half a church" in London: although the church is not named, it is usually identified with All Hallows.

The original Anglo-Saxon abbey of Barking was founded by Earconwald or Erkenwald, along with Chertsey Abbey, before he became Bishop of London in 675, and it has been claimed that the land on which All Hallows stands was granted to the abbey, under Abbess Æthelburh (Ethelburga), Erkenwald's sister, at that time. A charter dated to 687, listing properties belonging to Barking Abbey, includes two pieces of land in or near London. One of these was simply described as "iuxta Lundoniam", near/next to London, the other as "supra vicum Lundoniae", that is, in "Lundenwic", the Anglo-Saxon town that had grown up in the area of the Strand, a mile to the west of the old Roman city of Londinium; neither of these, though, accurately describes the location of All Hallows church, inside the wall of the Roman city on the eastern side.

In 1940, during World War II, the clearance after destruction caused by bombing revealed an archway built of reused Roman tiles and stonework, set in a surviving wall of the medieval church. The reuse of Roman building materials, and comparison with arches in the early Anglo-Saxon church at Brixworth, Northamptonshire, suggested that the All Hallows arch was very early in date, and that an original church could have been built as early as the 7th century. This seemed to confirm the belief that the church had been founded as a daughter church of Barking Abbey at about the same time as the abbey itself was established, although it is doubtful that the first construction on the site would have been in stone. It is more likely that the stone church, of which the arch is a remnant, superseded an earlier wooden building. Recent research, and archaeological evidence that Roman tiles and stone were being used in the construction of other London churches as late as the 11th century, suggest that the arch could have been constructed at any time between the 7th century and the arrival of the Normans. Fragments of three 11th-century stone crosses also found during archeological work in the 1930s and clearance works after the bombing, now displayed in the crypt, also date from this first church.

The church was expanded and rebuilt several times between the 11th and 15th centuries, with various elements of the Norman, 13th-century and 15th-century constructions still visible today. Its proximity to the Tower of London meant that it acquired royal connections, with Edward IV making one of its chapels a royal chantry and the beheaded victims of Tower executions being sent for temporary burial at All Hallows, Sir Thomas More being one of the most eminent of these.

The church was badly damaged by an explosion in 1650 caused when some barrels of gunpowder being stored in a warehouse adjacent to the church exploded; its west tower and some 50 nearby houses were destroyed, and there were many fatalities. The tower was rebuilt in 1658. It only narrowly survived the Great Fire of London in 1666 and owes its survival to Admiral William Penn, father of William Penn of Pennsylvania fame, who had his men from a nearby naval yard blow up the surrounding buildings to create firebreaks. During the Great Fire, Samuel Pepys climbed the church's tower to watch the progress of the blaze and what he described as "the saddest sight of desolation".

Restored once more in the late 19th century, All Hallows was gutted by German bombers during the Blitz in World War II and required extensive reconstruction, and was rededicated in 1957.

Many portions of the old church survived the War and have been sympathetically restored. Its outer walls are 15th-century, with the Anglo-Saxon arch doorway surviving from the original church. Many brasses remain in the interior. (The brass rubbing centre which used to be located at All Hallows is now closed). Three outstanding wooden statues of saints dating from the 15th and 16th centuries can also be found in the church, as too an exquisite Baptismal font cover which was carved in 1682 by Grinling Gibbons for £12, and which is regarded as one of the finest pieces of carving in London. The main-altar's reredos mural is a post-war work by Brian Thomas.

In 1999 the AOC Archaeology Group excavated the cemetery and made many significant discoveries.

The church has a museum in its crypt, containing portions of a Roman pavement which together with many artefacts was discovered many feet below the church in 1926/27. The exhibits focus on the history of the church and the City of London, and include Anglo-Saxon and religious artefacts as well as the 17th-century church plate. Also on display are the church's registers dating back to the 16th century, and notable entries include the baptism of William Penn, the marriage of John Quincy Adams (which is the only marriage of a U.S. president that occurred on foreign soil), and the burial of Archbishop William Laud. Laud remained buried in a vault in the chapel for over 20 years; his body was moved during the Restoration to St John's College, Oxford. The crypt also houses the church's chapels dedicated to St Francis (14th century) and St Clare (early 17th century) as well as the columbarium, created in 1933.

The altar in the crypt is of plain stone from the castle of Richard I at Athlit in The Holy Land.

All Hallows-by-the-Tower has been the guild church of Toc H since 1922. The church was designated a Grade I listed building on 4 January 1950.

The church also has a chime which was brought back to working order in the 1970s by Philip Blewett, then a priest at the church, and Desmond Buckley over many weekends.

The Knollys Rose Ceremony, held annually in June, starts at the church and processes to the Mansion House, where a single rose is presented to the Lord Mayor as a 'quit rent'. The parish's annual beating the bounds ceremony also includes a boat trip to the middle of the Thames to 'beat' the water that forms the southern boundary.

Notable people associated with the church 

 John Quincy Adams, sixth president of the United States: married to Louisa Catherine Johnson 1797
 Judge Jeffreys, notorious "hanging judge": married 1667
 William Laud, Archbishop of Canterbury: beheaded at the Tower, buried 1645
 Thomas More, beheaded at the Tower for refusing to sign Henry VIII's Act of Supremacy: buried 1535
 John Fisher, Bishop of Rochester, beheaded at the Tower 22 June 1535: buried
 Lancelot Andrewes: baptised 1555
 William Penn, founder of Pennsylvania: baptised 1644
 Albert Schweitzer, made organ recordings at All Hallows
 Philip Clayton, also known as 'Tubby', former vicar and founder of Toc H
 Cecil Thomas, a sculptor who provided several funerary figures between the Wars
 Cecil Jackson-Cole, founder of Help the Aged, Action Aid, co-founder of Oxfam and supporter of Toc H

Vicars 

 1269 John de S Magnus
 1292 William de Gattewicke
 1312 Gilbert de Wygeton
 1317 Walter Grapynell
 1333 Maurice de Jenninge
 1351 John Foucher
 1352 Nicholas Janing
 1365 Thomas de Broke
 1376 Thomas de Dalby
 1379 Laurence de Kagrer
 1387 William Colles
 1387 Robert Caton
 1390 Nicholas Bremesgrove
 1419 John Harlyston
 —— John Clerke
 1427 William Northwold
 1431 John Iford
 1434 Thomas Virley
 1454 John Machen
 1454 John Wyne
 —— John Walker
 1468 Thomas Laas
 1475 Robert Segrym
 1478 Richard Baldry
 1483 William Talbot
 1492 Edmund Chaderton
 1493 Rad Derlove
 1504 William Gedding
 1512 William Pattenson
 1525 Robert Carter
 1530 John Naylor
 1542 William Dawes
 1565 William Tyewhit
 1584 Richard Wood
 1591 Thomas Ravis
 1598 Robert Tyghe
 1616 Edward Abbott
 1654 Edward Layfield
 1680 George Hickes
 1686 John Gaskarth
 1732 William Geeke
 1767 George Stinton
 1783 Samuel Johnes Knight
 1852 John Thomas
 1884 Arthur James Mason
 1895 Arthur W. Robinson
 1917 Charles Lambert
 1922 Philip (Tubby) Clayton
 1963 Colin Cuttell
 1977 Peter Delaney
 2005 Bertrand Olivier
 2018 Katherine Hedderly

Organ 

The earliest records of an organ in All Hallows is one by Anthony Duddyngton dating from 1521. This was presumably lost during the English Civil War.

An organ was installed in 1675 by Thomas and Renatus Harris. In 1720 a new case was built by Gerard Smith. The organ was restored and improved by George Pike England in 1813, Bunting in 1872 and 1878, and Gray and Davison in 1902. There was further work by Harrison and Harrison in 1909 and 1928. After destruction in 1940, a new organ by Harrison and Harrison was installed in 1957.

Organists 
 Albertus Bryne II (or Bryan) 1675–1713
 Charles Young 1713–1758
 Charles John Frederick Lampe 1758–1767
 Samuel Bowyer 1767–1770
 Charles Knyvett and William Smethergell 1770–1783
 William Smethergell 1783–1823
 Mary Morrice 1823–1840
 Lisetta Rist 1840–1880
 Arthur Poyser
 Gordon Phillips 1956–1991
 Jonathan Melling

Gallery

See also 

 List of buildings that survived the Great Fire of London
 List of Churches in London
 Malta George Cross Memorial (located just outside the church)

References

External links 

 
 Location map (Multimap.com)
 Mystery Worshipper Report at the Ship of Fools website
 London Landscape TV episode (6 mins) about All Hallows By The Tower church

Church of England church buildings in the City of London
Diocese of London
11th-century church buildings in England
Churches bombed by the Luftwaffe in London
Religious museums in England
History museums in London
Museums of ancient Rome in the United Kingdom
Museums in the City of London
Grade I listed churches in the City of London